The 2006–07 OHL season was the 27th season of the Ontario Hockey League. The OHL announced, a new rule titled "Checking to the Head," effective for this season. Also announced, the recently adopted National Hockey League rule on stick curvature was not implemented until 2007–08. The season commenced on September 21, 2006, and twenty teams each played 68 games. The Sault Ste. Marie Greyhounds moved from Sault Memorial Gardens (demolished in May 2006) into the new Steelback Centre, which opened October 11, 2006. The Oshawa Generals moved mid-season from the Oshawa Civic Auditorium to the General Motors Centre, on November 3, 2006. The Plymouth Whalers won the J. Ross Robertson Cup defeating the Sudbury Wolves in the championship series.

Regular season

Final standings
Note: DIV = Division; GP = Games played; W = Wins; L = Losses; OTL = Overtime losses; SL = Shootout losses; GF = Goals for; GA = Goals against; PTS = Points; x = clinched playoff berth; y = clinched division title; z = clinched conference title

Eastern conference

Western conference

Scoring leaders
Note: GP = Games played; G = Goals; A = Assists; Pts = Points; PIM = Penalty minutes

Leading goaltenders
Note: GP = Games played; Mins = Minutes played; W = Wins; L = Losses: OTL = Overtime losses; SL = Shootout losses; GA = Goals Allowed; SO = Shutouts; GAA = Goals against average

CHL Canada/Russia Series
The 2006 ADT Canada-Russia Challenge between the OHL and the Russian team was hosted by the Sarnia Sting on November 23, 2006, and by the Oshawa Generals on November 27, 2006. The OHL won the first game 5–0, and the second game 4–3.

All-Star Classic
The All-Star Classic was played on January 31, 2007, at the Dow Event Center in Saginaw, Michigan. The Eastern Conference defeated the Western Conference 13–9 in the game attended by 5,527 spectators. The top scorers were Hunter Tremblay (Barrie Colts) and Sam Gagner (London Knights), each with five points. The Eastern Conference also prevailed 15–13 in the skills competition held the night before.

Playoffs
List of complete playoffs results.

Conference quarterfinals

Eastern conference

Western conference

Conference semifinals

Conference finals

J. Ross Robertson Cup

J. Ross Robertson Cup Champions Roster

Awards

All-Star teams

First team
John Tavares, Centre, Oshawa Generals
James Neal, Left Wing, Plymouth Whalers
Patrick Kane, Right Wing, London Knights
Marc Staal, Defence, Sudbury Wolves
Drew Doughty, Defence, Guelph Storm
Steve Mason, Goaltender, London Knights
Mike Vellucci, Coach, Plymouth Whalers

Second team
Bryan Little, Centre, Barrie Colts
Brett MacLean, Left Wing, Oshawa Generals
Tyler Donati, Right Wing, Belleville Bulls
Jakub Kindl, Defence, Kitchener Rangers
Ryan Parent, Defence, Guelph Storm
Michal Neuvirth, Goaltender, Plymouth Whalers
Mike Kelly, Coach, Mississauga IceDogs

Third team
Sam Gagner, Centre, London Knights
Jamie McGinn, Left Wing, Ottawa 67's
Sergei Kostitsyn, Right Wing, London Knights
Alex Pietrangelo, Defence, Mississauga IceDogs
Patrick McNeill, Defence, Saginaw Spirit
Thomas McCollum, Goaltender, Guelph Storm
Dave Barr, Coach, Guelph Storm

2007 OHL Priority Selection
On May 5, 2007, the OHL conducted the 2007 Ontario Hockey League Priority Selection. The Erie Otters held the first overall pick in the draft, and selected Ryan O'Reilly from the Toronto Jr. Canadiens. O'Reilly was awarded the Jack Ferguson Award, awarded to the top pick in the draft.

Below are the players who were selected in the first round of the 2007 Ontario Hockey League Priority Selection.

2007 CHL Import Draft
On June 27, 2007, the Canadian Hockey League conducted the 2007 CHL Import Draft, in which teams in all three CHL leagues participate in. The Erie Otters held the first pick in the draft by a team in the OHL, and selected Jaroslav Janus from Slovakia with their selection.

Below are the players who were selected in the first round by Ontario Hockey League teams in the 2007 CHL Import Draft.

2007 NHL Entry Draft
On June 22–23, 2007, the National Hockey League conducted the 2007 NHL Entry Draft held at Nationwide Arena in Columbus, Ohio. In total, 35 players from the Ontario Hockey League were selected in the draft. Patrick Kane of the London Knights was the first player from the OHL to be selected, as he was taken with the first overall pick by the Chicago Blackhawks.

Below are the players selected from OHL teams at the NHL Entry Draft.

See also
List of OHA Junior A standings
List of OHL seasons
2007 NHL Entry Draft
2007 Memorial Cup
2006–07 QMJHL season
2006–07 WHL season
2006 in ice hockey
2007 in ice hockey

References

External links
OHL web site
HockeyDB

OHL
Ontario Hockey League seasons